Șimnicu de Sus is a commune in Dolj County, Oltenia, Romania with a population of 4,425 people. It is composed of twelve villages: Albești, Cornetu, Deleni, Dudovicești, Duțulești, Florești, Izvor, Jieni, Leșile, Milești, Românești and Șimnicu de Sus.

References

Communes in Dolj County
Localities in Oltenia